The 2016 Newfoundland and Labrador Men's Curling Championship (also known as the Tankard), the men's provincial curling championship for Newfoundland and Labrador, was held from January 28 to 31 at the Re/Max Centre (the St. John's Curling Club) in St. John's, Newfoundland and Labrador. The winning Brad Gushue team represented Newfoundland and Labrador at the 2016 Tim Hortons Brier in Ottawa.

Teams
Teams are as follows:

Round-robin standings

Round-robin results

January 28
Draw 1
Thomas 7-6 Hunt
Gushue 9-2 Boland
Symonds 6-3 Rowsell

Draw 2
Rowsell 8-5 Boland
Thomas 8-2 Symonds
Gushue 11-1 Hunt

January 29
Draw 3
Gushue 9-4 Symonds
Hunt 6-5 Boland
Rowsell 6-4 Thomas

Draw 4
Gushue 8-1 Rowsell
Symonds 9-4 Hunt
Thomas 8-3  Boland

January 30
Draw 5
Rowsell 11-5 Hunt
Symonds 8-3 Boland
Gushue 8-5 Thomas

Tiebreakers
Rowsell 9-8 Symonds
Thomas 6-4 Rowsell

Final
Gushue must be beaten twice

Sunday, January 31, 10:00 am

References

External links
Scores

2016 Tim Hortons Brier
Sport in St. John's, Newfoundland and Labrador
Curling in Newfoundland and Labrador
2016 in Newfoundland and Labrador